Ground Zero (aka California Quake) is a 2000 American action film, directed by Richard Friedman.

Plot

A group of civilians and a mysterious agent are trying to stop illegal nuclear tests.

Cast
Janet Gunn as Kimberly Stevenson
Scott Terra as Justin Stevenson
Martin Hewitt as Robert Stevenson
Jack Scalia as Michael Brandeis
Vladimir Kulich as Bateman
Reginald VelJohnson as Burt Green
Roxana Zal as Victoria Heflin 
Christopher Neame as Andrew Donovan

External links

2000 action films
2000 films
American action films
2000s English-language films
2000s American films